Mountain View Auto Court (also known as the Mountain View Motel) is a complex of motel buildings in southwestern Ogden, Utah, that is listed on the National Register of Historic Places.

Description
The complex is located at 563 West 24th Street (SR-53) and includes seven structures built or remodelled for motel use between 1931 and 1939. Except for the four houses on the southeast corner, the complex occupies the entirety of the city block between C and B avenues and between West Capitol and West 24th streets. The oldest building was originally constructed in 1926. The complex is significant as the "oldest well-preserved motel in Ogden." The architecture styles reflected include Spanish Colonial Revival and Mission/Spanish Revival.

The motel was added to the National Register of Historic Places November 24, 1987. Although the listing includes multiple structures, it is not considered a historic district.

See also

 National Register of Historic Places listings in Weber County, Utah

References

External links

Motels in the United States
National Register of Historic Places in Weber County, Utah
Hotel buildings on the National Register of Historic Places in Utah
Mission Revival architecture in Utah
Hotel buildings completed in 1931